Soft despotism is a term coined by Alexis de Tocqueville describing the state into which a country overrun by "a network of small complicated rules" might degrade.  Soft despotism is different from despotism (also called 'hard despotism') in the sense that it is not obvious to the people.

Soft despotism gives people the illusion that they are in control, when in fact they have very little influence over their government.  Soft despotism breeds fear, uncertainty, and doubt in the general populace.  Alexis de Tocqueville observed that this trend was avoided in America only by the "habits of the heart" of its 19th-century populace.

Concept 

In Volume II, Book 4, Chapter 6 of Democracy in America, de Tocqueville writes the following about soft despotism:

See also 

 Dictablanda
 Enlightened absolutism
 Illiberal democracy
 Last man
 Managerial state
 Spoils system
 Totalitarian democracy

References 

Authoritarianism
Political ideologies